Jogaram patel is an Indian politician from the Bharatiya Janata Party. He was MLA from the Luni block in Jodhpur, Rajasthan.

References 

Bharatiya Janata Party politicians from Rajasthan

Members of the Rajasthan Legislative Assembly
Year of birth missing (living people)
Living people